Vlaškovci  is a village in the north-west Bosnia and Herzegovina in the Republika Srpska. According to the 2013 census, the village had 196 inhabitants. It's a part of the municipality of Kozarska Dubica.

Notable people 

 Mile Mećava (1915–1942), a Yugoslav Partisan and a hero from World War II.

References

Populated places in Dubica, Bosnia and Herzegovina